G. exigua may refer to:

 Galenia exigua, a perennial herb
 Gentiana exigua, a flowering plant
 Geodia exigua, a marine sponge
 Gobiopsis exigua, a true goby
 Grammoptera exigua, a longhorn beetle
 Grapholita exigua, a tortrix moth